Battle Mountain is an unincorporated town in and the county seat of Lander County, Nevada, United States. The population was 3,635 at the 2010 census. Its primary economic base is gold mining and, to a lesser extent, legalized gambling.

The town is located on Interstate 80 between Winnemucca and Elko.

History
The Battle Mountain area was home to the Northern Paiute and Shoshone peoples. The area was noted by fur trappers in the 1820s and '30s. It served as a waypoint for westward-bound travel on the Emigrant Trail along the Humboldt River by 1845. According to local legends, the name stems from confrontations between Native Americans and early settlers during the 1850s.

When copper ore was discovered and mining began in 1866, the Central Pacific Railroad started a station to support the mining activity. As of 2009, the same railway is still in use. In 1870, the railroad moved the Argenta station to Battle Mountain and established a townsite to serve the Battle Mountain copper and gold mining district.

In 1874, the Nevada Legislature overrode the governor's veto and approved a railroad from Austin to Battle Mountain.  The Nevada Central Railroad from Battle Mountain to Austin was completed in 1880. The rail line was constructed to connect the silver mines around Austin to the Central Pacific line at Battle Mountain. The rail line served the Austin area until it was abandoned in 1938.

Ulysses S. Grant spoke in the town in 1879 during his western speaking tour.

President Woodrow Wilson established Battle Mountain Indian Colony by executive order (Lander) in 1917. In 1919, Nevada's Red Scare Miners held a ten-day strike at the Battle Mountain Copper Mines.

On May 15, 1979, the voters of Lander County approved the move of the county seat from Austin to Battle Mountain in a special election. In a subsequent ruling, the Nevada Supreme Court affirmed this decision.

Chiefs Frank Temoke and Frank Brady refused the government's offer of a payoff under the 1863 Treaty of Ruby Valley at Battle Mountain on December 11, 1992.

The 2008 Wells, Nevada, earthquake of 6.3 magnitude that affected the northeastern part of the state severely damaged one of the city's oldest historical buildings, the Lemaire Building, which was condemned.

Geography

Battle Mountain is located at the confluence of two rivers, the Humboldt and the Reese. The town is in the Humboldt valley between the Shoshone Range to the southeast, the Battle Mountains to the southwest and the Sheep Creek Range across the Humboldt to the north.

Geology
Copper mining started in 1866 and the Copper Canyon Mine operated from 1917 until 1955.  The Tomboy-Minnie ore deposits were developed after the depletion of the West ore body, which was developed after the depletion of the East ore body.  Open-pit mining started in 1967.  Placer gold was discovered in 1912.  Mining switched from the copper-gold-silver ores to gold-silver ores in 1979.  The Fortitude gold-silver skarn body was discovered in 1981.  The Surprise gold deposit was discovered in 1986.

The economic geologic zone is primarily in the Antler Sequence, consisting of the Middle Pennsylvanian Battle Formation, the Pennsylvanian to Permian Antler Peak Limestone, and the Permian Edna Mountain Formation.  These Paleozoic rocks were intruded in the Tertiary by a granodiorite porphyry which generated the ore bodies as zones of disseminated sulfide minerals.  These zones include copper-gold-silver next to the granodiorite, followed by a gold-silver zone, then a lead-zinc-silver zone.

Battle Mountain meteorite
A meteorite fall was reported on 22 Aug 2012 on Battle Mountain at coordinates . It was classified as an ordinary chondrite, and a 1.4-pound (630-gram) fragment was sent to NASA's Jet Propulsion Laboratory for analysis.

Climate
Battle Mountain's climate is cool semi-arid (Köppen climate classification BSk), receiving just enough precipitation to avoid arid classification. Due to aridity and high elevation, the area commonly experiences large diurnal temperature variation, particularly in summer, when it averages almost .

Demographics

The 2020 census showed the Battle Mountain CDP to have a population of 3,705 people, up from 3,635 in 2010.

As of the census of 2000, there were 2,871 people, 1,053 households, and 731 families residing in the census-designated place (CDP) of Battle Mountain. The population density was 1,588.3 people per square mile (612.4/km2). There were 1,455 housing units at an average density of 804.9 per square mile (310.4/km2). The racial makeup of the CDP was 81.30% White, 0.14% African American, 2.54% Native American, 0.49% Asian, 0.03% Pacific Islander, 11.81% from other races, and 3.69% from two or more races. Hispanic or Latino of any race were 23.58% of the population.

There were 1,053 households, out of which 41.9% had children under the age of 18 living with them, 54.6% were married couples living together, 9.9% had a female householder with no husband present, and 30.5% were non-families. 25.2% of all households were made up of individuals, and 4.8% had someone living alone who was 65 years of age or older. The average household size was 2.71 and the average family size was 3.28.

In the CDP the population was spread out, with 33.8% under the age of 18, 8.1% from 18 to 24, 29.0% from 25 to 44, 22.4% from 45 to 64, and 6.7% who were 65 years of age or older. The median age was 32 years. For every 100 females, there were 104.1 males. For every 100 females age 18 and over, there were 104.4 males.

The median income for a household in the CDP was $42,981, and the median income for a family was $50,995. Males had a median income of $45,313 versus $25,417 for females. The per capita income for the CDP was $16,975. About 7.8% of families and 11.8% of the population were below the poverty line, including 14.1% of those under age 18 and 20.0% of those age 65 or over.

Arts and culture
Battle Mountain has a public library, a branch of the Elko-Lander-Eureka County Library System.

Sports
Battle Mountain hosts an annual bike race on a long, straight, flat stretch of Highway 305 just outside town. The event draws teams from all over the world as they attempt to build and pedal the fastest bicycles on earth. The event is known as the "World Human Powered Speed Challenge".

Reichert had an excellent week, setting five new records and smashing the previous  record set by Sebastiaan Bowier on September 14, 2013. Previously, Sam Whittingham's record run in 2009 won the decimach prize for going one tenth the speed of sound (with adjustments for slope and elevation).

Also annually held on the same stretch of road is the "Pony Express", an open road event from Battle Mountain to Austin and back. The race consists of vehicles ranging from 1960s-era muscle cars to the most modern sports cars.

Education
Public education in Battle Mountain is administered by Lander County School District, which operates Battle Mountain High School.

Infrastructure

Transportation

Battle Mountain is located along Interstate 80, approximately halfway between Reno, and Salt Lake City, Utah.

Battle Mountain is the starting point of Nevada State Route 305, which heads southward to Austin.

The Union Pacific Railroad line runs through Battle Mountain.

The historic narrow-gauge Nevada Central Railroad line ran from Battle Mountain to Austin, but has long been defunct.

This general aviation airport is owned by Lander County and operated by the Battle Mountain Airport Authority.

Notable people
Joyce Collins, jazz pianist, singer, and educator
Mary Dann and Carrie Dann, (Crescent Valley) Western Shoshone activists for cultural and spiritual rights and land rights
James H. Ledlie, Union officer in the Civil War whom Ulysses S. Grant called "the greatest coward of the war"
John Marvel, rancher and legislator
Jeannette Walls, author

In popular culture

Downtown Battle Mountain, the debut album by American post-hardcore band Dance Gavin Dance, was released on May 15, 2007. According to an interview with vocalist Jonathan Mess, the album took its name from Battle Mountain, which the band visited while the album was being written. A sequel to the album, Downtown Battle Mountain II, was released on March 8, 2011.
The Glass Castle, a memoir written by former MSNBC.com columnist Jeannette Walls, described a significant portion of her childhood in which she and her family lived in Battle Mountain while her father worked in the local mining industry.
Around the World in 80 Days, Fogg, Fix and Passepartout are traveling by stagecoach to the Transcontinental Railway, reaching Battle Mountain to take the train.

National recognition
In December 2001, The Washington Post published an article by Gene Weingarten titled "Why Not The Worst?" that popularly titled Battle Mountain as the "Armpit of America". The town used the unofficial title as a publicity opportunity, and hosted an annual "Armpit Festival" from 2002–2005, which was sponsored by Old Spice and awarded deodorant-themed prizes to participants.

On January 2, 2009, The New York Times released an article entitled "A Nevada Town Escapes the Slump, Thanks to Gold". The article regards the national economic depression and discusses Battle Mountain's economy.

References

External links

Local tourism website

Humboldt River
Census-designated places in Lander County, Nevada
County seats in Nevada
Unincorporated towns in Nevada